The Escort is a 2015 American romantic comedy-drama film directed by Will Slocombe, starring Michael Doneger and Lyndsy Fonseca.

Plot
Journalist Mitch is a sex addict. When he is fired, he applies for a job with a magazine. The editor promises to hire him if he writes a more interesting article than his competitors. He decides to write about Natalie, a Stanford-educated escort he met by chance. She is not interested at first, but after a violent encounter with a client, she allows him to accompany her and provide security. Mitch learns that Natalie also tutors school children in mathematics, she finds out about his sex addiction, and they become friends. When he visits his father and sister, he presents her as his girlfriend. She stands up for him when his father puts him down for not having achieved much, and she tells him that she was Internet-bullied because of a sex journal she wrote in college and cannot get a regular job. They have sex that night, and Mitch shows signs of jealousy when he accompanies her to her next clients. He picks a fight with one of them, and he and Natalie fall out. He later confesses his feelings for her and tries to make up with her, but she refuses.

At first Mitch does not want to go through with his article about Natalie, but the editor encourages him to, and the story becomes a success, which impresses his father. Mitch gets the job and joins a self-help group for his sex addiction. Finally, Natalie contacts him, tells him that she has given up prostitution, is enrolled in an MBA program and intends to start a legitimate tutoring business, and admits she loves him too. They start a relationship.

Cast
Lyndsy Fonseca as Natalie (aka Victoria)
Michael Doneger as Mitch
Tommy Dewey as JP 
Bruce Campbell as Charles
Rachel Resheff as Emily
Rumer Willis as Dana
Steven Ogg as Warren
Iqbal Theba as Richard

Reception
According to Sheri Linden of Variety, Michael Doneger and his co-star Lyndsy Fonseca in The Escort "played with charm... and their mercenary alliance proceeds as a spirited, mostly convincing, exploration of life in the big city."

Awards and nominations
 2015 Los Angeles Film Festival
 Nominated — LA Muse Award (Will Slocombe)

References

External links

 

2015 films
2015 independent films
2015 romantic comedy-drama films
2010s sex comedy films
American independent films
American romantic comedy-drama films
American sex comedy films
2010s English-language films
Films about prostitution in the United States
Films set in Los Angeles
Films shot in Los Angeles
The Orchard (company) films
2010s American films